The Garden State Stakes was an American Thoroughbred horse race held annually in mid November at the now defunct Garden State Park Racetrack in Cherry Hill, New Jersey. A futurity event for two-year-olds, it is sometimes referred to as the Garden State Futurity. By 1956, the total purse offered was more than $300,000 (including all nomination and starting fees), making it the richest horse race in the world.

The race was contested on dirt until 1994 when it was changed to a race on turf. It was raced at various distances: 
 On dirt:
 Inception – 1952: 6 furlongs on dirt
 1953–1972, 1993:  miles on dirt
 1985–1992:  miles on dirt
 1998 : 1 mile on dirt (1998 race switched from turf due to heavy rains)
 On turf:
 1994–1995 :  miles on turf
 1996–1997, 1999 : 1 mile on turf

In 1955, the racetrack created a counterpart for fillies called the Gardenia Stakes. 

The Garden State Stakes was placed on hiatus in 1973 and after a fire destroyed the racetrack on April 14, 1977  it would not be run again until a new track was built by International Thoroughbred Breeders, Inc. through its wholly owned subsidiary, Garden State Race Track, Inc. headed by Robert E. Brennan that opened on April 1, 1985. The March 18, 2000 issue of the Philadelphia Inquirer reported that the Garden State Stakes had been cancelled for financial reasons.

Winners

References

 The Garden State Futurity at Pedigree Query

Horse races in New Jersey
Discontinued horse races
Garden State Park Racetrack
Recurring sporting events established in 1944
Recurring sporting events disestablished in 1999
1944 establishments in New Jersey
1999 disestablishments in New Jersey